The Pope Francis bibliography contains a list of works by Pope Francis.

Apostolic Letter

Issued motu proprio

 Sanctuarium in ecclesia (February 11, 2017) Text
 Maiorem hac dilectionem (July 11, 2017) Text
 Magnum principium (September 3, 2017) Text 
 Summa familiae cura (September 8, 2017) Text
 Imparare a congedarsi (February 12, 2018) Text
 Law on the Government of Vatican City State (November 25, 2018) Text (IT)
 On the Pontifical Commission Ecclesia Dei (January 17, 2019) Text
 New statue of the auditor general (January 21, 2019) Text (IT)
 Communis vita (March 19, 2019) Text
 On the protection of minors and vulnerable persons (March 26, 2019) Text
 Vos estis lux mundi (May 7, 2019) Text
 Aperuit Illis (September 30, 2019) Text
 For the change of name of the Vatican Secret Archive to the Vatican Apostolic Archive (October 22, 2019) Text
 Regarding the office of dean of the college of cardinals (December 21, 2019) Text
 Law No. CCCLI on the Vatican City State Judicial System (March 16, 2020) Text (IT)
 On transparency, control and competition in the procedures for awarding public contracts of the Holy See and Vatican City State (May 19, 2020) Text
 Authenticum charismatis (November 1, 2020) Text
 Ab inito (November 21, 2020) Text
 Regarding certain competencies in economic and financial matters (December 26, 2020) Text
 Spiritus Domini (January 10, 2021) Text
 On amendments in matter of justice (February 8, 2021) Text
 Regarding the containment of expenditures for employees of the Holy See, the Governorate of Vatican City State, and other connected Entities (March 23, 2021) Text
 Regarding provisions on transparency in the management of public finances (April 26, 2021) Text
 Amending the jurisdiction of the judicial bodies of Vatican City State (April 30, 2021) Text
 Antiquum ministerium (May 10, 2021) Text
 Traditionis custodes (July 16, 2021) Text

Other
 Misericordia et misera (November 20, 2016) Text
 Admirabile signum (December 1, 2019) Text
 Scripturae Sacrae affectus (September 30, 2020) Text
 Patris Corde (December 8, 2020) Text
 Cando lucis aeternae (March 25, 2021) Text

Books 
 
 
 
 
 
 
 
 
 
 ; 
 
 

 
 
 
 
 
 
 
 Official Vatican transcript in English of IEC Catechesis The Eucharist: Gift from God for the life of the world (2008) (originally given in Spanish), 49th International Eucharistic Congress, Quebec, Canada
 Agencia Informativa Católica Argentina (1999–2012). Documentos de los obispos: Homilías y documentos del cardenal Bergoglio (in Spanish)

Bull 

 Misericordiae Vultus (April 11, 2015) Text

Encyclicals 

 Lumen fidei (June 29, 2013) Text
 Laudato si' (June 18, 2015) Text
 Fratelli tutti (October 3, 2020) Text

Exhortations 

 Evangelii gaudium (November 24, 2013) Text
 Amoris laetitia (March 19, 2016) Text
 Gaudete et exsultate (March 19, 2018) Text
 Christus vivit (March 25, 2019) Text
 Querida Amazonia (February 2, 2020) Text

References

External links 
 Vatican - Pope Francis

state=collapsed
Bibliographies by writer